The 2019 American Athletic Conference softball tournament was held at Cougar Softball Stadium on the campus of University of Houston in Houston, Texas, from May 9 through May 12, 2019.  The tournament was to determine the champion of the American Athletic Conference for the 2019 NCAA Division I softball season.  The tournament winner would have earned the American Athletic Conference's automatic bid to the 2019 NCAA Division I softball tournament. All games of the tournament aired on American Digital Network. Due to Weather conditions the last quarterfinal game between Houston and UConn, along with the two semifinal games, and championship game were canceled. Therefore the Automatic bid was awarded to the regular season champion .

Entering the event, Tulsa had won three straight championships, while UCF had won in 2015.  Former member Louisville won the first Tournament in 2014.

Format and seeding
The American's eight teams were seeded based on conference winning percentage from the round-robin regular season.  They then played a single-elimination tournament.

Results

Tournament
Sources:

Game restuls
Sources:

The championship was originally scheduled for ESPN2 on Saturday. Rain delays on Friday moved the Championship to Sunday and made it an American Digital Network broadcast.

References

American Athletic Conference softball tournament
Tournament
American Athletic softball tournament